An acute abdomen refers to a sudden, severe abdominal pain. It is in many cases a medical emergency, requiring urgent and specific diagnosis. Several causes need immediate surgical treatment.

Differential diagnosis 

The differential diagnosis of acute abdomen includes:

 Acute appendicitis
 Acute peptic ulcer and its complications
 Acute cholecystitis
 Acute pancreatitis
 Acute intestinal ischemia (see section below)
 Acute diverticulitis
 Ectopic pregnancy with tubal rupture
 Ovarian torsion
 Acute peritonitis (including hollow viscus perforation)
 Acute ureteric colic
 Bowel volvulus
 Bowel obstruction
 Acute pyelonephritis
 Adrenal crisis
 Biliary colic
 Abdominal aortic aneurysm
 Familial Mediterranean fever
 Hemoperitoneum
 Ruptured spleen
 Kidney stone
  Sickle cell anaemia
  Carcinoid

Peritonitis 
Acute abdomen is occasionally used synonymously with peritonitis. While this is not entirely incorrect, peritonitis is the more specific term, referring to inflammation of the peritoneum. It manifests on physical examination as rebound tenderness, or pain upon removal of pressure more than on application of pressure to the abdomen. Peritonitis may result from several of the above diseases, notably appendicitis and pancreatitis. While rebound tenderness is commonly associated with peritonitis, the most specific finding is rigidity.

Ischemic acute abdomen 

Vascular disorders are more likely to affect the small bowel than the large bowel. Arterial supply to the intestines is provided by the superior and inferior mesenteric arteries (SMA and IMA respectively), both of which are direct branches of the aorta.

The superior mesenteric artery supplies:
 Small bowel
 Ascending and proximal two-thirds of the transverse colon

The inferior mesenteric artery supplies:
 Distal one-third of the transverse colon
 Descending colon
 Sigmoid colon

Of note, the splenic flexure, or the junction between the transverse and descending colon, is supplied by the most distal portions of both the inferior mesenteric artery and superior mesenteric artery, and is thus referred to medically as a watershed area, or an area especially vulnerable to ischemia during periods of systemic hypoperfusion, such as in shock.

Acute abdomen of the ischemic variety is usually due to:
 A thromboembolism from the left side of the heart, such as may be generated during atrial fibrillation, occluding the SMA.
 Nonocclusive ischemia, such as that seen in hypotension secondary to heart failure, may also contribute, but usually results in a mucosal or mural infarct, as contrasted with the typically transmural infarct seen in thromboembolus of the SMA.
 Primary mesenteric vein thromboses may also cause ischemic acute abdomen, usually precipitated by hypercoagulable states such as polycythemia vera.

Clinically, patients present with diffuse abdominal pain, bowel distention, and bloody diarrhea. On physical exam, bowel sounds will be absent. Laboratory tests reveal a neutrophilic leukocytosis, sometimes with a left shift, and increased serum amylase. Abdominal radiography will show many air-fluid levels, as well as widespread edema. Acute ischemic abdomen is a surgical emergency. Typically, treatment involves removal of the region of the bowel that has undergone infarction, and subsequent anastomosis of the remaining healthy tissue.

Workup

Stable patients presenting to A&E (accident and emergency department) or ER (emergency room) with severe abdominal pain will almost always have an abdominal x-ray and/or a CT scan. These tests can provide a differential diagnosis between simple and complex pathologies. However, in the unstable patient, fluid resuscitation and a FAST-ultrasound are done first, and if the latter is positive for free fluid, straight to surgery. They may also provide evidence to the doctor whether surgical intervention is necessary.

Patients will also most likely receive a complete blood count (or full blood count in the U.K.), looking for characteristic findings such as neutrophilia in appendicitis.

Traditionally, the use of opiates or other painkillers in patients with an acute abdomen has been discouraged before the clinical examination, because these would alter the examination. However, the scientific literature does not reveal any negative results from these alterations.

References

External links 

General surgery
Medical emergencies
Medical terminology
Symptoms and signs: Digestive system and abdomen
Abdominal pain